Overnight is the third studio album by American pop band Parachute. It was released on August 13, 2013, by Mercury Records. In this album, the band was pushed further into the pop music industry by creating a new, more upbeat sound that was not heard as much in their previous albums. Parachute immediately began touring upon the release of this album. They started the tour off by headlining with Matt Hires, followed by a tour with Walk off the Earth and Gavin DeGraw.

Reception
The album debuted at No. 15 on the Billboard 200, No. 7 on the Digital Albums chart, selling around 15,257 copies in total on its first week of release. The album has sold 40,000 copies in the United States as of February 2016.

Singles
The band released the first single, "Hearts Go Crazy", on February 26, 2013. This song was eventually removed from the album's track listing. The release of their next single, "Can't Help", followed on June 4, 2013. Parachute performed "Can't Help" live on Leno and their track, "Higher", also from Overnight, has been featured on ESPN numerous times. Will Anderson, lead singer of Parachute, co-wrote the single "Can't Help" with OneRepublic's Ryan Tedder.

Track listing

Personnel
 Will Anderson – lead vocals, guitar, keyboards
 Alex Hargrave – bass, vocals
 Johnny Stubblefield – drums, percussion, vocals
 Kit French – saxophone, keyboards, vocals
 Nate McFarland – lead guitar, vocals

References

External links
 

Parachute (band) albums
2013 albums
Mercury Records albums